Wapello Land & Water Reserve is a nature reserve in the town now known as Hanover, Illinois, formerly Wapello, Illinois, as an honor to Chief Wapello of the Meskwaki tribe. The reserve is bordered on the east by Illinois Route 84 and on the west by the Apple River, as it approaches the Mississippi River. The reserve is managed by the Jo Daviess Conservation Foundation.

References

External links
Official home page
Illinois tourist board

Nature reserves in Illinois